The women's long jump at the 2018 World Para Athletics European Championships was held at the Friedrich-Ludwig-Jahn-Sportpark in Berlin from 20–26 August. 8 finals were held in this event.

Medalists

Results

T11

T12

T20

T37

T38

T47

T63

T64

See also
List of IPC world records in athletics

References

Long jump
2018 in women's athletics
Long jump at the World Para Athletics European Championships